Dhirendra Pratap Singh alias Rinku Singh  is an Indian politician from Janata Dal (United). He is member of the Bihar Legislative Assembly from the Valmiki Nagar seat in West Champaran district of Bihar. He won Valmiki Nagar constituency in 2015 Bihar Legislative Assembly election as an Independent politician later joined Janata Dal (United) and won 2020 Bihar Legislative Assembly election.

References

Living people
Janata Dal (United) politicians
Bihar MLAs 2015–2020
People from West Champaran district
Year of birth missing (living people)
Bihar MLAs 2020–2025